National Public Lands Day (NPLD) is celebrated annually at public lands in the United States on the fourth Saturday of September.  A signature event of the National Environmental Education Foundation, it promotes both popular enjoyment and volunteer conservation of public lands.

Three federal agencies and 700 volunteers launched the first National Public Lands Day in 1994.  By 2010, participation grew to 170,000 volunteers at over 2,000 sites across the country, the District of Columbia and U.S. territories.  In addition to National Public Lands Day being a fee-free day (free entry day) at many federally managed lands, volunteers who participate at federal land sites are rewarded with coupons for free entry into their favorite federal public land areas that have entrance fees.

The 2008 event featured an initiative to plant one million trees in honor of the 75th anniversary of the Civilian Conservation Corps. This goal was exceeded, with more than 1.6 million trees planted. The 2009 event featured a preview of The National Parks: America's Best Idea, which began airing the next night on PBS stations nationwide.  The preview was sent to each national park on DVD and aired in their visitor center auditoriums. Other National Public Lands Day events occurred on September 24, 2011 and  September 29, 2012.

See also 

 Civic engagement
 Community service
 Global Youth Service Day
 Good Deeds Day
 International Volunteer Day
 International Year of Volunteers
 Join Hands Day
List of awards for volunteerism and community service
 Make A Difference Day
 Mandela Day
 MLK Day of service
 Mitzvah Day
 National Cleanup Day
 National Philanthropy Day (USA and Canada)
 Office of Social Innovation and Civic Participation (US)
 Random Acts of Kindness Day
 Sewa Day
 Subbotnik
 World Kindness Day

References

External links

 National Public Lands Day

1994 establishments in the United States
Nature conservation in the United States
Observances in the United States
September observances
Recurring events established in 1994
Environmental awareness days
Saturday observances 
Holidays and observances by scheduling (nth weekday of the month)
Volunteering in the United States